The Ängelholm Ladies Open was a women's professional golf tournament on the Swedish Golf Tour, played between 2008 and 2010. It was always held in Ängelholm, Sweden.

Anna Nordqvist won the tournament in 2005, a full year before she joined Arizona State. After finishing runner-up in 2006 Caroline Hedwall won the tournament as part of her record four SGT victories in 2007, also a full year before she started at Oklahoma State.

Winners

References

Swedish Golf Tour (women) events